Dharmapal Barsingh Thapa (Nepali:धर्मपाल वरसिँह थापा) is ex Chief of Army Staff of Nepal (1995–1999) and Director of Avant venture. He belongs to Bagale Thapa clan.

References

Sources

1939 births
Living people
Nepalese generals
Bagale Thapa
People of the Nepalese Civil War